The 1990 BMW Trophy was an international field hockey competition played in Amsterdam. The tournament was sponsored by BMW, seven nations participated in a round-robin format playing against each other once. The tournament was played from 16 June to 24 June with Australia securing win over India on the final day to seal their title victory. Australia were tied on 9 points with Pakistan with equal goal difference but finished ahead of them on greater number of goals scored, Australia scored 20 goals to Pakistan's 18 goal.

Participating teams 
The following seven teams participated in the tournament on invitational basis, shown with their best results at the last World Cup (WC) and Olympics (OLY).

 Europe (4)
  (hosts) (WC:1st ; OLY:3rd)
  (WC:4th ; OLY:2nd)
  (WC:DNP ; OLY:1st)
  (WC:8th ; OLY:9th)
 Asia (2)
  (WC:10th ; OLY:6th)
  (WC:2nd ; OLY:5th)
 Oceania (1)
  (WC:3rd ; OLY:4th)

Results

Table 

Rules for classification: a) points b) goal difference c) goals for d) head-to-head

All times are in local standard

Fixtures

Statistics

Goalscorers 
There were 92 goals scored in 21 matches with an average of 4.38 goals per match

References 

1990 in sports
Field hockey competitions in the Netherlands
1990 in the Netherlands